M17 or M-17 may refer to:

Roads 
 M17 road (Ireland)
 M17 road (Bosnia and Herzegovina)
 Highway M17 (Ukraine)
 M-17 (Michigan highway)
 M17 (East London), a Metropolitan Route in East London, South Africa
 M17 (Cape Town), a Metropolitan Route in Cape Town, South Africa
 M17 (Johannesburg), a Metropolitan Route in Johannesburg, South Africa
 M17 (Pretoria), a Metropolitan Route in Pretoria, South Africa
 M17 (Durban), a Metropolitan Route in Durban, South Africa
 M17 (Port Elizabeth), a Metropolitan Route in Port Elizabeth, South Africa

Aircraft 
 Myasishchev M-17 Stratosphera (NATO reporting name Mystic-A), an early version of the Myasishchev M-55 reconnaissance aircraft
 Miles M.17 Monarch, a 1936 British, light, touring aeroplane 
 M.17, a German World War 1 prototype aircraft, the basis for one of the two Fokker B.II (1916)

Military Equipment 
 M17 Half-Track, an anti-aircraft variant of the M5 Half-track
 M17 rifle grenade used by the United States during World War II.
 Mikulin M-17, a Soviet copy of a German aircraft engine
 SIG Sauer M17 pistol, SIG Sauer P320 used by the United States armed forces
 M17 gas mask, formerly used as a standard  gas mask, for the United States Armed Forces

Other 
 HMS M17, First World War Royal Navy M15-class monitor
 BMW M17, car engine in the M10 family
 M17 agar, Lactococcus growth medium developed in 1971
 M17 or Messier 17, a nebula also called the Omega Nebula, the Swan Nebula, or several other names
 M17 or March 17, 2007 anti-war protest, organized by the ANSWER Coalition
 M17 Project, a free, open-source, digital communication protocol for amateur radio

See also

 R-M17, Haplogroup R1a1a of the human Y-chromosome
 Bushmaster M17S, a rifle manufactured in the United States
 
 
 
 17M (disambiguation)
 17 (disambiguation)
 Model 17 (disambiguation)